Hajah Amalia Haji Matali is an international lawn bowler from Brunei Darussalam.

Bowls career
Matali has represented Brunei Darussalam at the Commonwealth Games, in the pairs event at the 2002 Commonwealth Games.

She caused a sensation when reaching the final and winning the silver medal at the 2016 World Singles Champion of Champions in Brisbane, Australia.

References

Living people
Bowls players at the 2002 Commonwealth Games
Year of birth missing (living people)
Southeast Asian Games medalists in lawn bowls
Competitors at the 1999 Southeast Asian Games
Competitors at the 2017 Southeast Asian Games
Southeast Asian Games medalists for Brunei
Bruneian bowls players